Sam Woodyard (January 7, 1925 – September 20, 1988) was an American jazz drummer.

He was born in Elizabeth, New Jersey, United States. Woodyard was largely an autodidact on drums and played locally in the Newark, New Jersey area in the 1940s. He performed with Paul Gayten in an R&B group, then played in the early 1950s with Joe Holiday, Roy Eldridge, and Milt Buckner. In 1955, he joined Duke Ellington's orchestra and remained until 1966.

After his time with Ellington, Woodyard worked with Ella Fitzgerald, then moved to Los Angeles. In the 1970s, he played less due to health problems, but he recorded with Buddy Rich, and toured with Claude Bolling. In 1983, he belonged to a band with Teddy Wilson, Buddy Tate, and Slam Stewart. His last recording was on Steve Lacy's 1988 album, The Door.

He died of cancer in Paris at the age of 63.

Discography
With Cat Anderson
 Plays at 4 a.m. (Columbia, 1958)
 Ellingtonia (Wynne, 1959)
 A Chat with Cat Anderson (Columbia, 1963)

With Duke Ellington
 At Newport (Columbia, 1956)
 Duke Ellington Presents... (Bethlehem, 1956)
 A Drum Is a Woman (Columbia, 1957)
 Ellington at Newport (Columbia, 1957)
 Such Sweet Thunder (Columbia, 1957)
 The Cosmic Scene (Columbia, 1958)
 Newport 1958 (Columbia, 1958)
 Ellington Indigos (Columbia, 1958)
 Black, Brown and Beige (Columbia, 1958)
 Ellington Jazz Party (Columbia, 1959)
 Festival Session (Columbia, 1959)
 Solitude (Philips, 1960)
 Piano in the Background (Columbia, 1960)
 Piano in the Foreground (Columbia, 1963)
 The Symphonic Ellington (Reprise, 1963)
 Afro-Bossa (Reprise, 1963)
 Duke Ellington Meets Coleman Hawkins (Impulse!, 1963)
 Duke Ellington & John Coltrane (Impulse!, 1963)
 Duke Ellington & Django Reinhardt (Amiga, 1963)
 Ellington '65 (Reprise, 1964)
 The Popular Duke Ellington (RCA Victor 1966)
 Duke Ellington at the Cote d'Azur (Verve, 1967)
 "...And His Mother Called Him Bill" (RCA, 1968)
 Second Sacred Concert (Fantasy, 1968)
 Francis A. & Edward K. (Reprise, 1968)
 First Time! The Count Meets the Duke (Columbia, 1971)
 The Great Paris Concert (Atlantic, 1973)
 Yale Concert (Fantasy, 1973)
 Jazz at the Plaza Vol. II (Columbia, 1973)
 The Pianist (Fantasy, 1974)
 The Duke Lives On (Midi, 1974)
 Duke Ellington's Jazz Violin Session (Atlantic, 1976)
 All Star Road Band (Doctor Jazz, 1983)
 All Star Road Band Volume 2 (Doctor Jazz, 1985)
 Hot Summer Dance (Red Baron, 1991)

With Johnny Hodges
 Ellingtonia '56 (Norgran, 1956)
 Duke's in Bed (Verve, 1956)
 The Big Sound (Verve, 1957)
 Blues-a-Plenty (Verve, 1958)
 Not So Dukish (Verve, 1958)
 Johnny Hodges with Billy Strayhorn and the Orchestra (Verve, 1962)
 Swing's Our Thing  with Earl Hines (Verve, 1968)
 Ellingtonia! (Onyx, 1974)
 At the Sportpalast Berlin (Pablo, 1978)

With others
 Alice Babs, Serenade to Sweden (Telestar, 1966)
 Harry Carney, Rock Me Gently (Metronome, 1961)
 Rosemary Clooney, Blue Rose (Columbia, 1956)
 Paul Gonsalves, Cookin' (Argo, 1958)
 Jimmy Hamilton, Clarinet in High Fi (Urania, 1955)
 Jimmy Hamilton, Swing Low, Sweet Clarinet (World Record Club, 1963)
 Lionel Hampton, Ring Dem Vibes (Blue Star, 1976)
 Quincy Jones, The Birth of a Band! (Mercury, 1959)
 Brooks Kerr & Paul Quinichette, Prevue (Famous Door, 1974)
 Buddy Rich, The Roar of '74 (Groove Merchant, 1974)
 Joya Sherrill, Joya Sherrill Sings Duke (20th Century Fox, 1965)
 Billy Strayhorn, Live! (Roulette, 1969)
 Clark Terry, Duke with a Difference (Riverside, 1957)
 Clark Terry, Out on a Limb with Clark Terry (Argo, 1957)
 Clark Terry, Cruising (Milestone, 1975)
 Norris Turney, I Let a Song... (Black and Blue, 1978)
 Jimmy Woode, The Colorful Strings of Jimmy Woode (Argo, 1958)

References

Citations

General references
[ Sam Woodyard] at AllMusic

1935 births
1988 deaths
American jazz drummers
Musicians from New Jersey
People from Elizabeth, New Jersey
Duke Ellington Orchestra members
20th-century American drummers
American male drummers
American male jazz musicians
20th-century American male musicians